Nurettin Kayaoğlu (born 8 January 1992) is a football defender who plays for TuS Haltern. He made his Süper Lig debut on 19 August 2012. Born in Germany, he represented Turkey at youth international levels.

Career
He joined MSV Duisburg for the 2015–2016 season.

On 13 January 2020, Kayaoğlu joined German club TuS Haltern.

International career
Kayaoğlu represented Turkey at the 2009 UEFA European Under-17 Championship and 2009 FIFA U-17 World Cup.

References

External links

1992 births
Living people
Footballers from Duisburg
Turkish footballers
Turkey under-21 international footballers
Turkey youth international footballers
German footballers
German people of Turkish descent
Süper Lig players
TFF First League players
TFF Second League players
Regionalliga players
FC Schalke 04 II players
Kayserispor footballers
Adana Demirspor footballers
MSV Duisburg players
Boluspor footballers
Rot Weiss Ahlen players
Nazilli Belediyespor footballers
Bandırmaspor footballers
VfB Homberg players
Association football defenders